Slotted nut or slot nut can refer to:

Castellated nut also slotted nut
Split beam nut also slotted beam nut
T-slot nut